Aagha Ali Abbas is a Pakistani television actor, singer, presenter, writer, song writer, and director.

Early life and background
Agha Ali was born on 4 December 1985 in Lahore, Punjab. 

He is the younger son of the widely known actor of the 1980s, Agha Sikandar (d. 1993), himself the son-in-law of the legendary singer, actor, and producer Inayat Hussain Bhatti, who is thus Agha Ali’s maternal grandfather, making him a nephew of the television actor Waseem Abbas as well as a cousin of Ali Abbas and also the grandnephew of actor Kaifee. His brother Ali Sikandar is also an actor and writer while singer-turned-actor Ali Azmat is his mother's cousin.

Agha graduated with a Bachelor's degree in Arts from the Forman Christian  College.

Career
Agha was in college when, at the age of 19, he started his journey and became active in theater where he performed as an actor/singer in 15 to 20 theater plays. 

Officially his TV career started as an anchor-host in 2006 with the channel ATV, and with the successful program Total Round Up. He won the Best Anchor Award for the same program at the ATV Awards in 2006. 

He started his acting career with Yaad Piya Ki Aaye (2005) as Sameer, and then Satrangi (2008). 

He took a hiatus of about three years for his education, and during that time made the music video, '"Mera Pehla Rock Song", which was launched at the platform of the national television PTV Home in the show Morning With Juggan on 9 January 2013.

His leading role in the romantic series Mein Hari Piya (2012), on Hum TV, was well received by the critics and the public, and earned him a nomination for the Hum Award for Best Soap Actor. Rukhsaar, a television series on Geo TV, gained him further success. This was followed by the musical covers "Khwab Adhoore Sahi" and "Aaj Bhi". In 2014, he starred in Mere Meherbaan, Mehram and Digest Writer.

His career further advanced with the role of a rockstar in the 2015 religious drama series, Khuda Dekh Raha Hai, opposite Sajal Aly, for which he also sang the title song. Agha then played leading roles in several successful series, including Andaaz-e-Sitam (2017), Tumhare Hain (2017), Band Khirkiyan (2019), and Dil-e-Gumshuda (2019), which added to his popularity. 

Recently, he played the lead in the very popular drama Mujhe Khuda Pay Yakeen Hai which aired on Geo Entertainment.

Personal life
Agha has been in the news for his struggle story and for his courage in life as for him it was very difficult making his mark in the media world. Also he was in the news for a couple years for having a relationship with co-actor Sarah Khan and both were very popular as a couple but things changed as they both broke up. 

Later in 2019, he met with his now wife Hina Altaf during a project  Dil-e-Gumshuda. The couple married in a private Nikah ceremony on 22 May 2020 in Karachi.

Filmography

Television

Web series

Films 
Agha started shooting for his Debut Action Film under the Direction of (Late) Iqbal Kashmiri. Kashmiri died and the film was left incomplete.

References

External Links 
 
 
 
 

1985 births
Pakistani male television actors
21st-century Pakistani male singers
Pakistani male film actors
Living people
Male actors from Karachi
Urdu-language singers
Pakistani male singers
Singers from Lahore
Pakistani male composers
Male actors in Urdu cinema
21st-century Pakistani male actors
Male actors from Lahore
Pakistani composers
Pakistani male singer-songwriters